is a Japanese professional shogi player ranked 9-dan. He is the current holder of the Ōza title and a former holder of the Eiō title.

Early life
Nagase was born in Yokohama on September 5, 1992. He learned how to play shogi at age six from his grandfather, and entered the Japan Shogi Association's apprentice school in 2004 at the rank of 6-kyū under the guidance of shogi professional . He was promoted to 1-dan in 2007 and participated in the 3-dan League for the first time in April 2008, finishing with a record of 13 wins and 5 losses.

Nagase obtained professional status and the rank of 4-dan on October 1, 2009, after winning the 45th 3-dan League (April 2009September 2009) with a record of 14 wins and 4 losses.

Shogi professional
In October 2012. Nagase won his first tournament since turning professional when he defeated Shingo Itō 2 games to none to win the 2nd , and followed that up by defeating Tetsuya Fujimori a few days later to win the 43rd  by the score of 2 games to 1.

Nagase's first appearance in a major title match came in June 2016 when he challenged Yoshiharu Habu for the 87th Kisei title. Nagase defeated Yasuaki Murayama in the challenger tournament final to advance to the title match against Habu, and was actually leading the best-of-five match 2 games to 1 before losing the final two games.

In December 2017, Nagase defeated Reo Kurosawa in the  43rd Kiō challenger match to earn the right to challenge Akira Watanabe for the title. Nagase, however, was unable to capture his first major title, losing the match to Wantabe 3 games to 2 in March 2018.

In February 2019, Nagase defeated Tatsuya Sugai 2 games to 1 in the challenger playoff round for the 4th Eiō tournament to earn the right to challenge Taichi Takami for the title. In the AprilMay 2019 title match, Nagase defeated Takami 4 games to none to win his first major title.

In July 2019, Nagase defeated the reigning Mejin Masayuki Toyoshima in the final of the challenger tournament for the 67th Ōza title to earn the right to challenge the defending Ōza Shintarō Saitō. On October 1, 2019, Nagase won Game 3 of the 67th Ōza title match to complete a three game swept of Saitō. The win not only gave Nagase his first Ōza title and made him a 2-crown major title holder for the first time, but also meant he satisfied the promotion criteria for the rank of 8-dan.

Nagase was unable to defend his Eiō title in 2020, losing the 5th Eiō title match to challenger Masayuki Toyoshima on September 21, 2020, 4 games to 3. The two players actually needed nine games to determine the best-of-seven match because two of the games ended in impasse.

Nagase successfully defended his Ōza title in October 2020 by defeating Toshiaki Kubo in the 68th Ōza title match 3 games to 2. The win also meant that Nagase satisfied the criteria for promotion to 9-dan.

Nagase challenged the reigning Ōshō Akira Watanabe for the 70th Ōshō title in January to March 2021, but lost the match 4 games to 2.

In SeptemberOctober 2021, Nagase successfully defended his Ōza title by defeating Kazuki Kimura 3 games to 1.

In JuneJuly 2022, Nagase challenged Sōta Fujii for the 93rd Kisei title, but lost the match 3 games to 1. Later that same year, Nagase successfully defended his Ōza title by defeating  3 games to 1 in the 70th Ōza match (AugustOctober 2022).

Promotion history
Nagase's promotion history is as follows:
 6-kyū: September 29, 2004
 4-dan: October 1, 2009
 5-dan: April 24, 2012
 6-dan: June 17, 2013
 7-dan: November 22, 2017
 8-dan: October 1, 2019
 9-dan: October 14, 2020

Titles and other championships
Nagase has appeared in a major title match eleven times and has won five titles; in addition, he has won two non-major-title championships during his career.

Awards and honors
Nagase received the JSA's  for "Most Consecutive Games Won" in 2011 and 2013. He also received the awards for "Best New Player" and "Best Winning Percentage"
in 2012, and the “Fighting Spirit” and “Most Consecutive Games Won” awards in 2020.

Year-end prize money and game fee ranking
Nagase has finished in the "Top 10" of the JSA's  four times since turning professional: 4th place with JPY 46,780,000 in earnings for 2019; 3rd place with JPY 46,210,000 in earnings for 2020; 4th place with JPY 46,680,000 in earnings for 2022; and 4th place with JPY 48,210,000 in earnings for 2022.

References

External links
ShogiHub: Professional Player Info · Nagase, Takuya

1992 births
Japanese shogi players
Living people
Professional shogi players
People from Yokohama
Professional shogi players from Kanagawa Prefecture
Eiō
Ōza (shogi)
Kakogawa Seiryū
Shinjin-Ō